The European Cup was an association football competition contested from 1956 to 1992. Spanish manager José Villalonga led Real Madrid to success in the inaugural final in 1956 and repeated the feat the following season. English clubs and managers dominated the competition in the late 1970s and early 1980s, winning every tournament from 1977 to 1982. Despite this, Italian managers have been the most successful, winning twelve of the tournaments since 1956.

The competition became the UEFA Champions League in 1992, with Belgian Raymond Goethals leading French club Marseille to success that season.

Carlo Ancelotti is the only manager to have won the tournament on four occasions. Bob Paisley and Zinedine Zidane have won the tournament on three occasions. Paisley led Liverpool to three titles in five seasons, Ancelotti won four titles and reached five finals with Milan and Real Madrid, and Zidane won three consecutive titles with Real Madrid. Seventeen other managers have won the title on two occasions. Only five managers have won the title with two clubs: Carlo Ancelotti with Milan in 2003 and 2007 and Real Madrid in 2014 and 2022; Ernst Happel with Feyenoord in 1970 and Hamburger SV in 1983; Ottmar Hitzfeld with Borussia Dortmund in 1997 and Bayern Munich in 2001; José Mourinho, with Porto in 2004 and Inter Milan in 2010; and Jupp Heynckes with Real Madrid in 1998 and Bayern Munich in 2013. Seven men have won the tournament both as a player and as a manager, namely Miguel Muñoz, Giovanni Trapattoni, Johan Cruyff, Ancelotti, Frank Rijkaard, Pep Guardiola and Zidane.

By year

Managers with multiple titles

By nationality
This table lists the total number of titles won by managers of each country. Accurate as of the 2022 final.

See also
European Cup and UEFA Champions League records and statistics

References
General

Specific

External links
UEFA Champions league official history
RSSSF European Cups Archive 

Managers
Uefa Champions League